Permatang Berangan is a state constituency in Penang, Malaysia, that has been represented in the Penang State Legislative Assembly.

The state constituency was first contested in 1995 and is mandated to return a single Assemblyman to the Penang State Legislative Assembly under the first-past-the-post voting system. , the State Assemblywoman for Permatang Berangan is Nor Hafizah Othman from Barisan Nasional (BN).

Definition

Polling districts 
According to the federal gazette issued on 30 March 2018, the Permatang Berangan constituency is divided into 10 polling districts.

Demographics

History

Election results

See also 
 Constituencies of Penang

References

Penang state constituencies